Tmesisternus papuanus is a species of beetle in the family Cerambycidae. It was described by Stephan von Breuning in 1945.

References

papuanus

Beetles described in 1945